Lija is a small village in the Central Region of Malta. It forms part of the Three villages of Malta, along with Attard and Balzan. Lija has a baroque parish church and seven other small chapels. The parish church is dedicated to Our Saviour. Lija became a parish in 1594, after the small community detached itself from the neighbouring town, Birkirkara. It has a population of 3,162 as of 2021.

Culture

Lija is mostly known for its fireworks displays that attract thousands of locals and tourists during the festa period held in the first week of August. These displays are very well renowned and claimed to be the best around the island. The Lija fireworks team also won an international fireworks competition held in Monaco back in 1980. In 2006, the Lija fireworks factory placed second in a Fireworks festival organised at the Grand Harbour in Malta's capital, Valletta.

Lija also hosts the Maltese Citrus festival, held each year.

Lija has several old houses of character and large citrus gardens. The Lija Belvedere Tower and Villa Francia are a main attraction. The official University Residence of the University of Malta is also situated in this village.

Lija Athletic F.C. is the village's football club. This club has been promoted to Malta's Premier (highest) Division for three times in its history. Considering the small size of the village and the resource and financial limitations, this was deemed to be a huge success by local sport enthusiasts. Lija Athletic, with the collaboration of the Local Council inaugurated a new synthetic pitch on 6 July 2007 (Jum Ħal Lija or "Lija Day"). This pitch is situated in the village's primary school grounds. This year, 2009, the club is celebrating its 60th Anniversary since its foundation.

British author Anthony Burgess, whose works include A Clockwork Orange, resided in Lija for three years (1968-1970). At Lija there is also Villa Parisio, where politician Mabel Strickland, daughter of Lord Gerald Strickland, lived.

Lija Local Council 

The current 2017 Lija local council members are:

 Anthonby Dalli (Mayor, PN)
 Daniel Mallia (Deputy Mayor PN)
 Donio Cini (PN)
 Joseph Zahra (PL)
 Lorraine Farrugia (PL)

Band clubs 
 St. Pius X Band and Society Club (Is-Soċjetà Mużikali Banda San Piju X)

Zones in Lija 
 Ħal Mann (Mann Town)
 Ta' Bajdun
 Ta' Seguna (Seguna's Village)
 Tad-Daħla (Entrance Village)
 Tad-Daqqaq (Cotton Worker's Village)
 Tal-Mirakli (Miracles' Village)
 Wied Lija (Lija Valley)

Main roads 
 Triq Annibale Preca
 Triq Carmelo Farrugia
 Triq il-Forn
 Triq il-Kbira (Main Street)
 Triq il-Mosta (Mosta Road)
 Triq Robert Mifsud Bonnici
 Triq Sant' Andrija
 Triq Sant' Antnin (St Anthony Street)
 Triq Sir Ugo Mifsud
 Vjal it-Trasfigurazzjoni (Transfiguration Avenue)
 Triq Gużeppi Portelli

References

External links 

 Lija Local Council
 Lija Athletic F.C.
 Lija Parish
 6 August - Titular Feast
  Places to visit in Lija

 
Towns in Malta
Local councils of Malta